The Seeker (also known as The Seeker: The Dark Is Rising) is a 2007 American family drama-fantasy film, a very loose film adaptation of the children's fantasy novel The Dark Is Rising (1973) by Susan Cooper. The film is directed by David L. Cunningham and stars Ian McShane, Alexander Ludwig, Frances Conroy, Gregory Smith, and Christopher Eccleston as the Rider. The Seeker is the first film to be produced by 20th Century Fox and Walden Media as part of their Fox-Walden partnership. On his 14th birthday Will Stanton (Ludwig) finds out that he is the last of a group of warriors – The Light – who have spent their lives fighting against evil – The Dark. Will travels through time to track down the signs that will enable him to confront the evil forces. The Dark is personified by The Rider (Eccleston). The film performed poorly at the box office and received strong negative reaction from both critics, fans of the book series & even Susan Cooper herself  for its disregard of the source material.

Plot

Will Stanton (Alexander Ludwig) is a day away from his fourteenth birthday. As the Stanton children walk home, Miss Greythorne (Frances Conroy), the local mistress of the Manor, and her butler Merriman Lyon (Ian McShane) invite the siblings to a Christmas party. Later, two farmers, Dawson (James Cosmo) and Old George (Jim Piddock), whom Will does not know, arrive at his house with a large Christmas tree ordered by the family. The farmers know Will's name, wish him a happy birthday, and predict a storm despite the relatively clear sky. Will's birthday is so close to Christmas that everyone in his large family ignores it except for his little sister Gwen (Emma Lockhart), who gives him his only birthday present (a Casio G-Shock Mudman wristwatch). The family has moved from the United States to a small English village and one of his brothers has arrived home for the holidays and displaces Will to the attic. For a Christmas present, Will buys Gwen an enigmatic stone pendant at the local mall. Two suspicious security guards accuse him of shoplifting and take him to their office. Alarmingly, as they question Will under the room's flickering lights, the guards metamorphose into rooks. They attack Will, but he manages to escape, accidentally using his powers for the first time. Will begins to experience more odd incidents and receives a strange and Celtic-looking belt from his oldest brother, Stephen (Jordan J. Dale).

At the Manor Christmas party, Will once again sees Dawson and Old George who seem to know him well. Miss Greythorne and Merriman debate about when and how to approach Will about his destiny. Maggie Barnes (Amelia Warner), an attractive local girl appears at the party and Will becomes upset when one of his older brothers approaches her and begins chatting to her. Will leaves the Manor, and an ominous figure mounted on a white horse, accompanied by dogs, chases Will. As the ominous figure prepares to kill Will, who is currently no match for him, Miss Greythorne, Merriman, Dawson, and Old George suddenly appear and save Will. Merriman names the threatening figure as The Rider (Christopher Eccleston), who warns them all that in five days' time his power – The Dark – will rise. The four adults are the last of the Old Ones – ancient warriors who serve The Light – and take Will on a walk through time and space to a place called the Great Hall, which in the present day is the church the Stantons attend. Will is the last of the Old Ones to have been born: he is the seventh son of a seventh son whose power begins to ascend on his fourteenth birthday, though Will disputes this idea because he believes he is the sixth son. Will is The Seeker: the sign-seeker who must locate six Signs whose possession will grant The Light power over The Dark. The Rider is also seeking them. Will returns home to his attic room and falls and twists his ankle. The doctor, who the mother called, is The Rider in disguise but he is recognized by Will. The Rider demonstrates his powers on Will's ankle by alternately healing it and making it much worse before restoring it to its injured state; he offers Will the chance to have any desire he wants fulfilled in exchange for giving him the signs. Will discovers he has a lost twin brother named Tom, who, as a baby, mysteriously disappeared one night and was never found. Merriman instructs Will on his powers, which include sensing the Signs, summoning superhuman strength, commanding light and fire, telekinesis, stepping through time, and the unique knowledge to decipher an ancient text in the Book of Gramarye. Unfortunately, Will learns he can't fly, a power he wanted.

Will returns to The Great Hall and learns the form each sign will take. Will reveals the first sign within Gwen's pendant. As the sign-seeker, Will travels through time to find the next four signs. The Rider enlists a mysterious figure to help him get the signs from Will. When Will's brother invites Maggie to their home, she reveals some of her powers to Will. Will reveals his affections for her, saying he felt an instant connection with her. He tells her he has been thinking of her constantly. The Rider also tricks Will's older brother Max, using his magic to partially control him. The spell over Max is finally broken when Will uses his great strength to give Max a concussion. By the fifth day, The Dark that The Rider commands has now gained tremendous power and begins to attack the village with a terrible blizzard. Will locates the fifth sign but without the sixth sign, the Dark continues to rise. Maggie is revealed to be the mysterious witch helping the Rider in exchange for eternal youth. She is betrayed by him (for failing to get any of the signs) when she fails to get the fifth sign and ages rapidly, disintegrating into a flood of water while trying to steal them from Will. The Old Ones and Will seek sanctuary in the Great Hall, where the Rider cannot enter unless invited. However, The Rider's final trick (impersonating the voices of Will's mother and father, as well as Gwen) gains him access to The Great Hall. The Rider reveals that he has trapped Tom, whom The Rider mistook for The Seeker and kidnapped, within a glass sphere (and apparently took care of all of these years). He sends Will into an evil dark cloud. As he enters, Will solves the riddle of the sixth sign: he himself is the sixth sign. With all six signs identified The Rider cannot touch nor harm Will. Using his power over the dark, Will banishes both The Rider – imprisoning the evil figure within one of his own glass spheres – and The Dark. The sphere disappears into the murky water. Will and Tom are reunited and return to their family, who are thrilled to see Tom.

Cast
 Alexander Ludwig as Will Stanton. The seventh son of a seventh son, Will is the descendant of Thomas Stanton who created the six signs. The youngest male in his family and born with special powers that reveal themselves on his 14th birthday. The powers of The Seeker. At first he seems inexperienced and prone to emotional overreaction, but in the end, he saves the world from The Dark. Ludwig also plays a small role as Will's twin brother Tom who was lost, taken by The Rider when he was a few weeks old. He was freed after Will defeated The Dark.
 Christopher Eccleston as The Rider. By day he disguises himself as the Village doctor. He is The Dark of the world. At many points in the film, it shows that ravens follow his command.
 Ian McShane as Merriman Lyon. An Old One, a fighter for The Light and one of Will's primary instructors on how to fight the dark. For most of the film, he is emotionally distant from Will, trying to encourage him to be a warrior instead of listening to him.
 Frances Conroy as Miss Greythorne. An Old One, a fighter for The Light and one of Will's primary instructors on how to fight the dark. She is the owner of Huntercombe Manor and a generous benefactor to the college where Will's father now teaches. She is hinted to have pulled some strings in order to get the Stanton family to the village.
 James Cosmo as Dawson. An Old One, a fighter for The Light. Very humorous and is undercover as a farmer in the village, he originally gives the Stantons their Christmas tree. Best friend of George. He was traumatized by the initial belief that George was lost to The Dark.
 Jim Piddock as Old George. An Old One, a fighter for The Light Very humorous and is undercover as a farmer in the village, he originally gives the Stanton's their Christmas tree where he reveals he knows Will's name. Best friend of Dawson. After a fight with The Rider in a bar, it is believed that he was either killed or lost to The Dark, saddening his best friend Dawson. However, he is seen alive and well after The Rider is defeated.
 Amelia Warner as Maggie Barnes. A pretty girl in high school whom Will has a crush on. In the beginning, he couldn't work up the nerve to talk to her. After his brother, James, begins to date her, she and Will meet for the first time where she hints that she is an 'Old One'. She is a cause of emotional distress for Will throughout the film until it is revealed that she is an ancient witch who works for The Rider in exchange for remaining youthful.

 Stanton family 
 John Benjamin Hickey as John Stanton, Will's father and a lecturer at a college in the United Kingdom, he is initially critical of his son Max and seems too busy to listen to Will. It is revealed that when Will was a new-born, his twin brother Tom was kidnapped as John was working on a thesis, The Light and The Dark, and the loss of his son, the guilt and emotional distress he went through made him abandon the thesis. Hickey also plays a small role as Thomas Stanton, an ancestor of the Stanton family and the creator of the Six Signs.
 Wendy Crewson as Mary Stanton, Will's mother. A housewife who holds great love for her family and great pain from the loss of one her sons, Tom.
 Emma Lockhart as Gwen Stanton, Will's sister, the only girl of the Stanton family and the only one to give Will a proper present on his birthday. A kind girl, she is the first of his family to unintentionally witness his power as he takes her to a Viking battle where she rescues a lost kitten. She promises not to say anything to anyone else, showing her and Will's close relationship. This is seen further when Will is threatened with the death of the person he loves most, and this person turns out to be Gwen.
 Drew Tyler Bell as James Stanton, Will's older and more arrogant brother who dates Maggie and causes Will to be jealous. He teases Will with the fact he got to date Maggie at the beginning of the film.
 Edmund and Gary Entin as Robin and Paul Stanton, Will's older brothers who happen to be twins. The twins bully Will slightly but they do love him.
 Gregory Smith as Max Stanton, Will's older brother, shown to be coming home for the holidays from college and taking Will's room forcing Will to move to the attic. It is later revealed that Max dropped out. He is taken over by The Rider for a short period of time. He tries to take the Signs away from Will under The Rider's influence. When Will speaks to Max trying to convince him to leave him be, Max is knocked unconscious and comes back free of The Rider. Max later tells his father, who is critical of him in the film's beginning, that he dropped out of college.
 Jordan J. Dale as Stephen Stanton, Will's oldest brother, a member of the United States Navy, it appears that he is commissioned to Hawaii when he sends the family floral print shirts. Shown to be looked up to and admired by his siblings. Instead of sending Will a shirt, he sends him the Celtic belt that he uses to hold the signs. Shown for a brief time only.

Production

Development
In July 1997, Jim Henson Pictures optioned the rights for the film adaptation of Susan Cooper's novel The Dark Is Rising. The company attached Duncan Kenworthy as producer and Andrew Klavan as screenwriter, with the film's budget estimated to be $20 million.  Brian Henson, president and CEO of the company, pursued the purchase of the rights because the book was one of his favorites. In May 2005, with production never becoming active under Henson Pictures, the film adaptation rights were purchased by Walden Media, who attached Marc E. Platt to produce the project. In August 2006, Walden Media announced a joint venture with the studio 20th Century Fox to distribute Walden projects through Fox channels.  The next October, director David Cunningham was hired to helm the film, then titled The Dark Is Rising. Cunningham visited Romania to prepare production for an early 2007 start to target a September 28, 2007 release date.

Writing
The Seeker: The Dark Is Rising is very loosely based on the second book in Susan Cooper's series The Dark Is Rising Sequence, titled The Dark Is Rising.  Walden Media hired screenwriter John Hodge in October 2005 to adapt the story for the big screen.  The mythology of Cooper's book was considered to be the plot, and Hodge was tasked to interpret the book into events that could be portrayed in a film.  The story, which took place in the 1960s and 1970s in the book, was rewritten to be contemporary. Vikings were included in the film, based on a reference in the book to an old Viking boat which the protagonist discovers. Hodge rewrote the protagonist Will Stanton, portrayed by Alexander Ludwig, to be 14 instead of 11. The screenwriter chose this age, considering 11 to be more of a child's age, and 14 to be an age of transition.  Stanton was also written to be American so he would be established as more of an outsider, culturally alien to the story's English setting.  Hodge also wrote new subplots for Ludwig's character in the film, including sibling conflicts, a crush on a young woman (Amelia Warner), and alienation at school.  The script also features the inclusion of many action sequences.  The character of The Walker, portrayed by Jonathan Jackson, was also rewritten as a younger person with a new story arc about the loss of his soul.  However, Jackson's character was ultimately removed from the film's theatrical cut.  Susan Cooper was reportedly not happy with the adaptation of her book.

Filming
Filming began on February 26, 2007, in Romania.  The film was shot on several soundstages at MediaPro Studios in Buftea, Romania.  Several sets built at the soundstages included an English village, the Stanton family's country home, a medieval church, and a mysterious ruin known as the Great Hall.  Cinematographer Joel Ransom chose to have such sets, including the reconstruction of the 13th-century chapel that took four months to construct, built to surround the actors so he could use 360-degree camera sweeps in the locations to represent time travel sequences. Director David Cunningham chose to minimize the use of visual effects in The Seeker, only creating around 200 visual effects for the film.  Instead, the director pursued practical means to carry out the effects of the film's scenes.  A thousand snakes were shipped in from the Czech Republic to be dumped on the actors, real water was used to wipe out a mansion in the film, and real birds were trained to fly at the actors. Cunningham also hired Viking reenactors to assist with the Viking element in the film. The crow-like birds are consistent with the book's signature harbingers of the Dark: the rooks. One visitor to the set said that the rooks were represented by "a half-dozen trained ravens." Costume designer Vin Burnham designed a riding cloak for The Rider (Christopher Eccleston), a black get-up lined with real fur and feathers for an animalistic appearance.  Burnham provided eccentric 1960s outfits for the character Miss Greythorne (Frances Conroy), with Celtic symbols incorporated into the outfits.  The costume designer also wove small crystals into the outfits worn by Conroy and Ian McShane so that the outfits glisten on camera.

Release
Production on The Seeker began early in 2007 to target a September 28, 2007 release date.  The release date was eventually moved a week later, to October 5, 2007, during Columbus Day weekend. Up until July 27, 2007, the film was titled and marketed only as The Dark Is Rising.  Fox Walden changed the film title from The Dark Is Rising to The Seeker: The Dark Is Rising.  Prior to its release, the film's title was finalized to be The Seeker in the United States market. In the Canadian market, the film was released simultaneously with the U.S. distribution but under the title The Seeker: The Dark is Rising.  In the United Kingdom, the film was released under the title The Dark is Rising. The Seeker was reported to have issues leading to its release: author Susan Cooper was not happy with the adaptation of her book, the film's title was changed repeatedly, and advance screenings were canceled.

Home media
The Seeker was released on DVD on March 18, 2008. Region 4 and Region 2 DVDs contain 'Extended/Deleted Scenes' which include outtakes of Jonathan Jackson's scenes as the Walker. There are also two featurettes, and optional director's commentary on the extended/deleted scenes. The Region 1 DVDs lacked the extended/deleted scenes.

Reception

Box office
The Seeker was released in the United States and Canada on October 5, 2007. The film grossed $3,745,315 in 3,141 theaters in its opening weekend, ranking No. 5 at the box office in the United States and Canada. The Seeker had one of the poorest starts for a fantasy film. Box Office Prophets questioned why the film was opened in so many venues, with the cost for prints in 3,141 theaters exceeding its opening weekend gross. , The Seeker has grossed $8.8 million, in the United States and Canada and $22.6 million in other territories for a worldwide total of $31.4 million. The Seeker had the second worst debut of all time for a film released in more than 3,000 theaters, placing behind Walden's 2006 comedy-adventure film Hoot. The Seeker then lost the most theaters in its third weekend, ahead of Hoot. (Most wide releases are contractually obliged to stay at a particular screen for two weeks and can be dropped by a theatre only at the beginning of the third week.)

Critical response
Critical reception to the film has been largely negative. On Rotten Tomatoes the film has an approval rating of 14% based on reviews from 93 critics. The site's consensus states: "The magic of the book is lost in translation with The Seeker, due to its clumsy plot and lack of heart." On Metacritic, the film has a weighted average score of 38% based on reviews from 21 critics, indicating "generally unfavorable reviews".

The only positive feedback from most critics went toward Christopher Eccleston's performance. The New York Posts Kyle Smith objected that, "Good and evil don't seem to be trying to destroy each other so much as come up with cool-looking effects to show off, as if they were competing in a 'Project Runway' for wizards... [and] given superpowers, Will does approximately nothing with them." Gianni Truzzi of the Seattle Post-Intelligencer opined that the movie lacked the "grandiose elements" of "magic rooted in its ties to Arthurian legend and British folklore" that made the books so memorable. The Boston Globes  Ty Burr panned the movie for not understanding its intended audience of book-readers, saying, "the producers have tried to gin up the story for multiplex audiences. They've succeeded in making a movie for no audience at all." And The New York Times's Jeannette Catsoulis complained that "John Hodge's screenplay is frequently dreary and overly literal... The Seeker feels passé and lacks a charismatic lead." One of the few somewhat-positive reviews came from the Chicago Tribunes Kelley L. Carter, who said that "At its best, The Seeker is a pretty vivid fantasy book come-to-life" and found the lead character of Will Stanton to have been "played convincingly." Another came from the Baltimore Sun's Michael Sragow, who found that The Seeker had "a lot going for it, including wonderful sets and locations...that create a heightened-reality English hamlet". Both gave the movie only 2 stars out of 4.

Several of the reviewers mentioned the Harry Potter movies. The New York Times's Catsoulis mentioned, "Too bad Daniel Radcliffe is an only child." The Chicago Tribune's Carter wrote, "Harry Potter, meet your not-so-much cousin... had it not been for the Potter series, the bar for children’s fantasy film wouldn't be quite as high, and The Seeker falls short of the high-riding, high-quality material delivered in the Harry Potter film series." The New York Post's Smith went so far as to title his review "Bad Harry Day" and to joke that "In today's England, a teenage boy is instructed by grown-up mentors in the use of magical powers while a dark lord who comes in many formats promises an epic battle. The movie is based on a 1973 book by Susan Cooper, who must be trembling in fear of being sued for ripping off J.K. Rowling's ideas and publishing them 20 years in advance." The Boston Globe's Burr described the parallels more clearly, saying that "against him is a metrosexual meanie called The Rider (Christopher Eccleston), sort of a He Who Can Be Named. In general, Cooper's story line has been Potterized to little avail: Will's family is as large as the Weasleys, as unloving as the Dursleys, and no fun whatsoever."

Soundtrack
 "The Sweetest Disguise" – Performed by The Sunday Drivers 
 "Jingle Bells" – Performed by The CSSR State Philharmonic
 "We Wish You a Merry Christmas" – Performed by The CSSR State Philharmonic
 "Deck the Halls" – Performed by Nicolaus Esterházy Sinfonia
 "Joy to the World" – Lyrics by Issac Watts, music attrib. George Frideric Handel (no performer credited)
 "The Seeker" – Performed by Big Linda

References

External links
 
 
 
 
 The Seeker at Walden Media
 Interview with Christopher Eccleston
 Interview with author Susan Cooper

2007 films
Films directed by David L. Cunningham
Films based on British novels
Films based on fantasy novels
Films shot in Romania
Walden Media films
20th Century Fox films
Films based on children's books
High fantasy films
Films set in country houses
Films scored by Christophe Beck
Dune Entertainment films
Films produced by Marc E. Platt
Films with screenplays by John Hodge
2000s English-language films
American fantasy adventure films
2000s American films